Mihailo Ovčarević (1550–79) was a Habsburg Serb vojvoda (commander) of the Šajkaši (river flotilla).  Mihailo Ovčarević belonged to the Ovčarević family, a notable Serb family in Habsburg service in the 16th century, and was a relative of the earlier Petar Ovčarević (fl. 1521–41), a Šajkaši commander and spy, and contemporaries Dimitrije Ovčarević (fl. 1552–66), captain of Gyula, and Jovan Ovčarević (fl. 1557), an emissary. He is mentioned in 1550 as a vojvoda of the Šajkaši. After a denunciation, Emperor Ferdinand I had Mihailo imprisoned, where he stayed for several months until having proved his innocence. As compensation, Ferdinand I issued him a yearly 50 gold coins, which was then changed to 25. In 1557 he asked the War Council to appoint him a vojvoda in Komárno. It is unknown whether he succeeded. It seems that he continued living on his low pension which was not paid regularly; the payment issue is evident from his many appeals. He is last mentioned in 1579.

References

Sources
 
 
 
 

16th-century Serbian people
Serbian military leaders
Habsburg Serbs
Serbs of Vojvodina
16th-century Hungarian nobility